Wade G. Regehr is a Professor of Neurobiology at Harvard Medical School's Department of Neurobiology.

Early biography
Born in Shaunavon, Saskatchewan, Canada, Regehr attended the University of Regina in Canada where he received the Governor General's Award, then received his Ph.D. at Caltech in applied physics with David Rutledge. His doctorate was at the interface between neuroscience and electrical engineering.

Research
Regehr's laboratory studies the implication of calcium Ca2+ as it affects synaptic strength. Neurons communicate with one another via synapses. Regehr was one of the first to use fluorescent imaging to see the synaptic activity occurring in the brain. A dye alters the fluorescence properties when attached to calcium, and changes in intracellular calcium are associated with neuronal activity (firing of action potentials). Using fluorescence-microscopy techniques, calcium levels are detected, and therefore the influx of calcium in the presynaptic neuron.

Calcium processes affect the release of neurotransmitter from the axon terminal. (Occasionally this happens in reverse).

Chemical synapses are characterized by the presynaptic release of neurotransmitters that diffuse across a synaptic cleft to bind with postsynaptic receptors. A neurotransmitter is a chemical messenger that is synthesized within neurons themselves and released by these same neurons to communicate with their postsynaptic target cells. By studying the physiological process and mechanisms, a further understanding is made of synaptic depression and delayed release of the neurotransmitter, synaptic potentiation, facilitation and other calcium dependent chemical processes.

Awards

Regehr received the Governor General's Award after receiving his undergraduate degree from the University of Regina. Regehr has been awarded the Senator Jacob Javits Award in the Neurosciences.  This award provides funding for a possible seven years to research neurological disorders. The funding is provided by the National Institute of Neurological Disorders and Stroke (NINDS).  Regehr's study of short term synaptic plasticity (synapse strength during behavioral tasks) is relevant to neurological disorders such as epilepsy, schizophrenia and depression.

Regehr also was granted a scholar award from The McKnight Endowment Fund for Neuroscience for The Role of Presynaptic Calcium in Plasticity at Central Synapses in 1993. The McKnight Scholar Awards  are given to PhD candidates who have an interest in the study of disorders affecting learning and memory. The funding establishes laboratories for emerging neuroscientists who can develop clinical neuroscience research.

See also

 Axon terminals

References

Living people
Harvard Medical School faculty
American neurologists
California Institute of Technology alumni
Canadian neurologists
Year of birth missing (living people)
People from Shaunavon, Saskatchewan
American neuroscientists
Canadian neuroscientists